Wignacourt is a surname. Notable people with the surname include:

House of Vignacourt 
Adrien de Wignacourt (1618–1697), Grand Master of the Knights Hospitaller from 1690 to 1697
Alof de Wignacourt (1547–1622), Grand Master of the Knights Hospitaller from 1601 to 1622
Maximilien de Wignacourt (1560–1620), Baroque poet

Vignacourt, a comune in France

See also
Portrait of Alof de Wignacourt and his Page (Caravaggio) (1607–1608), painting by the Italian master Caravaggio, in the Louvre of Paris
Wignacourt towers, a series of fortified towers on Malta built by Alof de Wignacourt from 1610 to 1620
Wignacourt Tower, the first of these towers
Wignacourt Aqueduct, an aqueduct on Malta built by Alof de Wignacourt from 1610 to 1615
Wignacourt Arch, an archway within the aqueduct
Wignacourt Museum, a museum in Rabat, Malta named after Alof de Wignacourt